This is a list of Kogi State administrators and governors. Kogi State was created on 27 August, 1991 out of Benue State and Kwara State.

See also
States of Nigeria
List of state governors of Nigeria

References

Kogi
Governors